Poor Cow is a 1967 British kitchen sink drama film directed by Ken Loach and based on Nell Dunn's 1967 novel of the same name. It was Ken Loach's first feature film, after a series of TV productions. The film was re-released in the UK in 2016.

Plot
18-year-old Joy, who comes from a big family with a heavy drinking mother and womanising father, leaves home to marry Tom and they have a son, Johnny. Tom mentally and physically abuses Joy and shows little interest or affection. He has been in prison for four years and, when he is jailed again after being caught attempting a big robbery, Joy and her very young son are left on their own.

After briefly sharing a room with her Aunt Emm, an aging prostitute, Joy moves in with Dave, one of Tom's criminal associates. Dave is tender and understanding, but the idyll is shattered when he is sentenced to 12 years' imprisonment for leading a robbery which results in a woman being blinded, and given his long criminal record, early release seems unlikely. Intending to be faithful to Dave, Joy moves back with Aunt Emm, writes to Dave frequently, and initiates divorce proceedings against Tom.

After taking a job as a barmaid, Joy starts modelling for a seedy photographers' club and drifts into promiscuity. She likes men giving her presents but is too impulsive and easygoing to make a living as a prostitute. Bored with her humdrum surroundings, she dreams of bettering herself. When Tom is released, Joy goes back to him after he promises to move her from her small grotty flat to a modern well-furnished house. However, one evening, after Tom has slapped her several times, Joy goes out and upon returning, she finds Tom watching TV and Johnny missing. Joy frantically searches for Johnny and finally finds him alone on a demolition site where he has gone to play. Realising how much Johnny means to her, Joy decides to stay with Tom despite the abuse, but continues to dream of a future with Dave.

Main cast

Credited despite scenes being cut
 Malcolm McDowell as Billy
 George Sewell as Customer in Pub

Production
Terence Stamp says Ken Loach was inspired to write the film after meeting Carol White during Cathy Come Home:
But he really didn’t write it; we didn’t really have a script. That was one of the things that was interesting about it. It was just wholly improvised. He had the idea, he had the overall trajectory in his mind, but we didn’t have a script. And, consequently, it had to be Take One because each of us had cameras on us. So before a take, he’d say something to Carol, and then he would say something to me, and we only discovered once the camera was rolling that he’d given us completely different directions. That’s why he needed two cameras, because he needed the confusion and the spontaneity.

Filming locations
Set in London, the Winstanley and York Road Estates in Battersea were amongst the locations featured prominently in the background.

Music
The opening credits attribute the film music to Donovan, although many pop songs like "Funny how love can be" by the Ivy League and "Not Fade Away" by the Rolling Stones from the era are heard in the film. Three Donovan songs are heard in the film, including the title song.  The melody of the title song is repeated instrumentally in diverse arrangements in several parts of the film. It was released as single B-side to "Jennifer Juniper" in early 1968 in a different arrangement and with altered lyrics. For example, the standard release version opens with the line "I dwell in the north in the green country", while the version in the film opens with the line "I dwell in the town in the grey country".

Other songs by Donovan in the film are "Be Not Too Hard" and "Colours", the latter of which is sung by the character played by Terence Stamp.

Reception

Box office
The film was a surprise success at the box office. It sold to the US for more than its production cost and did extremely well in Italy and Britain. According to Kinematograph Weekly, there were four British films in the top ten general releases of 1968: Up the Junction, Poor Cow, Here We Go Round the Mulberry Bush and Carry on Doctor.

Critical response
The Monthly Film Bulletin was critical of the film, summing it up as a "superficial, slightly patronising incursion into the nether realms of social realism". The review characterised Loach's direction as an "incongruous mixture of realism and romanticism" that, along with the cinematography, "suffuses the material in a cheery glow of lyricism that often verges on sentimentality."  Writing in The Guardian, Richard Roud criticised the film as "downright awful" and particularly criticised "the tiresomely obvious documentary shots constantly thrown in to emphasise the ugliness of our couple’s surroundings", although he did praise Terence Stamp's performance as "superb".

Film critic Renata Adler of The New York Times wrote in her review: "Poor Cow, which opened yesterday at the Murray Hill and other theaters, begins with some shots of the real birth of a baby, and goes on to become one of those ringingly false Technicolor British films about working-class life in London. It is not very good; but January has been, in general, a poor month for movies, and it might be a good idea to look at the bright side—which, since the quality of the color makes England look like April in Disneyland, is very bright indeed." On the film's re-release in 2016, Kate Muir in The Times gave the film four stars out of five and described the film as "incredibly moving".

Later use
Clips of Stamp's performance in Poor Cow were used to show the early life of Wilson, the character he portrays in Steven Soderbergh's film The Limey (1999).

References

External links

1967 films
1967 drama films
British drama films
Films about domestic violence
Films about dysfunctional families
Films based on British novels
Films directed by Ken Loach
Films about prostitution in the United Kingdom
Films set in London
Films shot in London
Social realism in film
1967 directorial debut films
Films shot at Twickenham Film Studios
1960s English-language films
1960s British films